Corcoran Airport  was a public use airport located two nautical miles (3.7 km) west of the central business district of Corcoran, a town in Kings County, California, United States. It is privately owned by Lakeland Dusters, Inc. The airport has been permanently closed.

Facilities and aircraft 
It has one asphalt paved runway designated 13/31 which measures 3,800 by 50 feet (1,158 x 15 m).

For the 12-month period ending October 3, 2007, the airport had 5,600 aircraft operations, an average of 15 per day, all of which were general aviation. At that time there were 18 aircraft based at this airport: 61% single-engine, 28% jet and 11% helicopter.

World War II
During World War II, the airport was used an auxiliary training airfield for Lemoore Army Airfield, California.

See also

 California World War II Army Airfields

References

External links 

Airports in Kings County, California
Corcoran, California
San Joaquin Valley
Airfields of the United States Army Air Forces in California